Danny Dariel Salazar (born January 11, 1990) is a Dominican professional baseball starting pitcher who is currently a free agent. He has played in Major League Baseball for the Cleveland Indians.

Career

Cleveland Indians
Salazar signed with the Indians as an international free agent in 2006. He spent two years playing rookie-level ball for the Indians, then spent 2009 through 2011 with the Lake County Captains. The Indians purchased his contract on November 18, 2011, to protect him from the Rule 5 draft. He spent 2012 with the Carolina Mudcats and Akron Aeros, For the week ending May 5, 2013, Salazar was named Eastern League Pitcher of the Week while playing for the Aeros, and was promoted to the AAA Columbus Clippers shortly afterward.

Salazar was recalled from the Triple-A Columbus Clippers on July 11, 2013, and made his Major League baseball debut as the starting pitcher against the Toronto Blue Jays.  He took a no-hitter into the 6th inning, striking out seven batters in six full-innings of work, the most strikeouts for an Indians' starting pitcher in his major league debut since Luis Tiant struck out eleven batters in his debut in 1964. He was optioned back to Columbus on July 12. Danny Salazar was called up to make a spot start on August 7, 2013, against the Detroit Tigers. Salazar made his first career post-season start for the Indians against the Tampa Bay Rays in the 2013 American League Wild Card Game.

In 2014, Salazar split the season between the Indians and Clippers, pitching in 20 games for the major league club and finishing with a 6-8 record and a 4.25 ERA.

Salazar was named to the American League All-Star Team in 2016.

After struggling through his first 10 starts of the 2017 season, earning an ERA of 5.50, Salazar was moved to the bullpen on May 28, 2017, but resumed starting on July 22, 2017. He finished the season 5-6 with a 4.28 ERA in 19 starts, he also made 4 relief appearances. He struck out 145 in 103 innings.

He began the 2018 season on the 60 day disabled list. On June 30, 2018, it was announced Salazar would undergo exploratory surgery on his right shoulder. On July 2, 2018, Salazar officially underwent surgery on his right shoulder, suppressing his chances of playing in the MLB for the 2018 year. In the aftermath of the surgery, Salazar was required not to throw for 12 to 16 weeks. Salazar made his 2019 debut on August 1 against the Houston Astros, surrendering two runs on 66 pitches in a 7–1 loss. Salazar was placed back on the 10-day injured list the following day with a groin injury. On September 6, 2019, Salazar was transferred to the 60-day injured list, effectively ending his 2019 season with him having made only one appearance with the Indians. Following the 2019 season, Salazar was released by the Indians and became a free agent.

New York Yankees
On May 13, 2022, Salazar signed a minor league contract with the New York Yankees organization. He was released on September 20, 2022, He appeared in 2 games in Triple-A with a 3.86 ERA and had struck out 4 in 2.1 innings.

References

External links

1990 births
Living people
Akron Aeros players
American League All-Stars
Arizona League Indians players
Carolina Mudcats players
Cleveland Indians players
Columbus Clippers players
Dominican Republic expatriate baseball players in the United States
Dominican Summer League Indians players
Gulf Coast Indians players
Lake County Captains players
Mahoning Valley Scrappers players
Major League Baseball pitchers
Major League Baseball players from the Dominican Republic
Sportspeople from Santo Domingo
Tigres del Licey players